There are 134 scheduled monuments in the county of Bedfordshire in the East of England. These protected sites date from the Neolithic period and include barrows, churches, castle earthworks, moated sites and medieval priories.
In the United Kingdom, the scheduling of monuments was first initiated to insure the preservation of "nationally important" archaeological sites or historic buildings. The protection given to scheduled monuments is given under the Ancient Monuments and Archaeological Areas Act 1979

Notable scheduled monuments in Bedfordshire

See also
List of scheduled monuments
List of World Heritage Sites in the United Kingdom

References

Scheduled monuments in Bedfordshire